The Lower Tauern or Niedere Tauern are a mountain range of the Central Eastern Alps, in the Austrian states of Salzburg and Styria.

For the etymology of the name, see Tauern.

Geography 
The range forms a part of the main chain of the Alps. The highest peak of the Lower Tauern is the Hochgolling, part of the Schladming Tauern, at 2,863 m (9,393 ft).

Important mountain pass roads include Radstädter Tauern Pass, Sölk Pass, and Triebener Tauern Pass. The range is also crossed by the Tauern Autobahn (A10) through the Tauern Road Tunnel.

Borders 
In the west and south the Murtörl mountain pass and the River Mur separate them from the Hohe Tauern mountain range, while in the east and north the River Enns and the Schober Pass marks the border to the Northern Limestone Alps.

Alpine Club classification 
According to the Alpine Club classification of the Eastern Alps, the Lower Tauern may be divided into four subgroups (from west to east):
 Radstadt Tauern (45a)
 Schladming Tauern (45b)
 Rottenmann and Wölz Tauern (45c)
 Seckau Tauern (45d).

The four groups listed above (the Radstadt Tauern, Schladming Tauern, Rottenmann and Wölz Tauern and Seckau Alps) are considered Alpine subsections.

Notable summits

Some notable summits of the range are:

Geology and environment 
The Lower Tauern mark the approximate eastern limit of the continuous ice sheet in the Alps during the Würm glaciation. Eastern parts of the group were therefore unglaciated, and served as an important refugium for silicicolous plants.

Winter sports 
A number of skiing resorts are situated in the Lower Tauern, including Obertauern and Schladming.

References

External links

Tauern Tunnel - Price and Tips Updated 2015

Mountain ranges of the Alps
Mountain ranges of Styria
Mountain ranges of Salzburg (state)